Tuesdays with Morrie is a memoir by American author Mitch Albom about a series of visits Albom made to his former sociology professor Morrie Schwartz, as Schwartz gradually dies of ALS. The book topped the New York Times Non-Fiction Best-Sellers List for 23 combined weeks in 2000, and remained on the New York Times best-selling list for more than four years after. In 2006, Tuesdays with Morrie was the bestselling memoir of all time.

An unabridged audiobook was also published, narrated by Albom. The appendix of the audiobook contains excerpts from several minutes of audio recordings that Albom made during his conversations with Schwartz before writing the book.

A new edition with an afterword by Albom was released on the book's ten-year anniversary in 2007.

Synopsis
In 1995, Albom is a successful sports columnist for the Detroit Free Press. After seeing his former sociology professor Morrie Schwartz appear on Nightline, Albom phones Schwartz and is prompted to visit him in Massachusetts. A coincidental newspaper strike allows Albom to visit Schwartz every week, on Tuesdays. The book recounts each of the fourteen visits Albom made to Schwartz, supplemented with Schwartz's lectures and life experiences and interspersed with flashbacks and references to contemporary events.

After being diagnosed with Amyotrophic lateral sclerosis (ALS), Morrie's final days are spent giving his former student Mitch his final lesson of life. The memoir is divided into 14 different "days" that Mitch Albom spent with his professor Morrie. Throughout these days, Mitch and Morrie discuss various topics important to life and living. The memoir also recounts Mitch's memories of Morrie as a professor.

The 1st Audiovisual
This was the first episode out of three on a Nightline special on Morrie and his illness. Morrie caught the eye of a Nightline television producer after an article was published titled: "A Professor's Final Course: His Own Death." It was through this airing that Morrie's old student Mitch was reminded of his old professor, causing him to reach out and reconnect.

Main characters

Mitch Albom

Mitch Albom was born in May 1958 in New Jersey. Originally, he was a pianist and wanted to pursue a life as a musician. Instead he became an author, journalist, screenwriter, and television/radio broadcaster. In his college years, he met sociology professor Dr. Morrie Schwartz who would later influence his memoir, Tuesdays with Morrie.

Morrie Schwartz

Morrie Schwartz was a sociology professor at Brandeis University who was diagnosed with Amyotrophic lateral sclerosis (ALS), also known as Lou Gehrig's disease. The son of Russian immigrants, Schwartz had a difficult childhood, indelibly marked by the death of his mother and his brother's infection with the Polio virus. He later went on to work as a researcher in a mental hospital, where he learned about mental illness and how to have empathy and compassion for other people. Later in life, he decided to become a sociology professor in hopes of putting his accumulated wisdom to use. This is where he met his student Mitch Albom, who would later become a lifelong friend. Schwartz was married to Charlotte Schwartz, with whom he had two children. After a long battle with ALS, Morrie died on 4 November, 1995. His tombstone reads, "A teacher until the end."

Adaptations
The book was adapted into a 1999 television film, directed by Mick Jackson and starring Hank Azaria and Jack Lemmon.

In 2002, the book was adapted as a stage play that opened off Broadway at the Minetta Lane Theatre. Co-authored by Mitch Albom and Jeffrey Hatcher (Three Viewings) and directed by David Esbjornson (The Goat or Who Is Sylvia?). Tuesdays with Morrie starred Alvin Epstein as Schwartz and Jon Tenney as Albom. It received positive reviews.

See also

 The Five People You Meet in Heaven
 For One More Day
 The Last Lecture
 Have a Little Faith
The Time Keeper
 The Ultimate Gift
 The Magic Strings of Frankie Presto

References

External links

 
 
 Summary and analysis of Tuesdays with Morrie at Sparknotes

1997 novels
American novels adapted into films
Biographical novels
Brandeis University
Films based on non-fiction books
Novels set in Massachusetts
American philosophical novels
Self-help books
English-language novels
Doubleday (publisher) books